You and Lee is an album by American jazz saxophonist Lee Konitz which was released on the Verve label in 1959.

Critical reception

Scott Yanow of Allmusic states "One of the lesser-known Lee Konitz albums, this LP features the altoist joined by six brass and a rhythm section for eight Jimmy Giuffre arrangements. The shouting brass contrasts well with Konitz's cool-toned solos and together they perform eight underplayed standards".

Track listing 
 "Everything I've Got (Belongs to You)" (Richard Rodgers, Lorenz Hart) – 4:44
 "You Don't Know What Love Is" (Gene de Paul, Don Raye) – 4:19
 "You're Driving Me Crazy" (Walter Donaldson) – 4:10
 " I Didn't Know About You" (Duke Ellington, Bob Russell) – 4:00
 "(You're Clear) Out of This World" (Harold Arlen, Johnny Mercer) – 4:05
 "The More I See You" (Harry Warren, Mack Gordon) – 3:38
 "You Are Too Beautiful" (Rodgers, Hart) – 4:05
 "I'm Getting Sentimental Over You" (George Bassman, Ned Washington) – 4:04

Personnel 
Lee Konitz – alto saxophone
Marky Markowitz – trumpet
Ernie Royal – trumpet
Phil Sunkel – trumpet
Eddie Bert – trombone
Billy Byers – trombone
Bob Brookmeyer – valve trombone
Bill Evans – piano (tracks 1, 2, 4 & 8)
Jim Hall – guitar (tracks 3 & 5–7)
Sonny Dallas – bass
Roy Haynes – drums
Jimmy Giuffre – arranger, conductor

References 

1959 albums
Lee Konitz albums
Verve Records albums